John Bardeen (May 23, 1908 – January 30, 1991) was an American physicist and engineer. He is the only person to be awarded the Nobel Prize in Physics twice: first in 1956 with William Shockley and Walter Brattain for the invention of the transistor; and again in 1972 with Leon N. Cooper and John Robert Schrieffer for a fundamental theory of conventional superconductivity known as the BCS theory.

The transistor revolutionized the electronics industry, making possible the development of almost every modern electronic device, from telephones to computers, and ushering in the Information Age. Bardeen's developments in superconductivity—for which he was awarded his second Nobel Prize—are used in nuclear magnetic resonance spectroscopy (NMR), medical magnetic resonance imaging (MRI), and superconducting quantum circuits.

Born and raised in Wisconsin, Bardeen received a Ph.D. in physics from Princeton University. After serving in World War II, he was a researcher at Bell Labs and a professor at the University of Illinois. In 1990, Bardeen appeared on Life magazine's list of "100 Most Influential Americans of the Century."

Education and early life
Bardeen was born in Madison, Wisconsin, on May 23, 1908. He was the son of Charles Bardeen, the first dean of the University of Wisconsin Medical School.

Bardeen attended University of Wisconsin High School in Madison. He graduated from the school in 1923 at age 15. He could have graduated several years earlier, but this was postponed because he took courses at another high school and because of his mother's death. Bardeen entered the University of Wisconsin in 1923. While in college, he joined the Zeta Psi fraternity. The needed membership fees he raised partly by playing billiards. Bardeen was initiated as a member of Tau Beta Pi engineering honor society. Not wanting to be an academic like his father, Bardeen chose engineering. He also felt that engineering had good job prospects.

Bardeen received his Bachelor of Science degree in electrical engineering in 1928 from the University of Wisconsin. Despite taking a year off to work in Chicago, he graduated in 1928. Taking all the graduate courses in physics and mathematics that had interested him, Bardeen graduated in five years instead of the usual four. This allowed him time to complete his master's thesis, supervised by Leo J. Peters. He received his Master of Science degree in electrical engineering in 1929 from Wisconsin.

Bardeen furthered his studies by staying on at Wisconsin, but he eventually went to work for Gulf Research Laboratories, the research arm of the Gulf Oil Corporation that was based in Pittsburgh. From 1930 to 1933, Bardeen worked there on the development of methods for the interpretation of magnetic and gravitational surveys. He worked as a geophysicist. After the work failed to keep his interest, he applied and was accepted to the graduate program in mathematics at Princeton University.

As a graduate student, Bardeen studied mathematics and physics. Under physicist Eugene Wigner, he wrote his thesis on a problem in solid-state physics. Before completing his thesis, he was offered a position as Junior Fellow of the Society of Fellows at Harvard University in 1935. He spent the next three years there, from 1935 to 1938, working with to-be Nobel laureates in physics John Hasbrouck van Vleck and Percy Williams Bridgman on problems in cohesion and electrical conduction in metals,and also did some work on level density of nuclei. He received his Ph.D. in mathematical physics from Princeton in 1936.

Career and research

World War II service
From 1941 to 1944, Bardeen headed the group working on magnetic mines and torpedoes and mine and torpedo countermeasures at the Naval Ordnance Laboratory. During this period, his wife Jane gave birth to a son (Bill, born in 1941) and a daughter (Betsy, born in 1944).

Bell Labs

In October 1945, Bardeen began work at Bell Labs as a member of a solid-state physics group led by William Shockley and chemist Stanley Morgan. Other personnel working in the group were Walter Brattain, physicist Gerald Pearson, chemist Robert Gibney, electronics expert Hilbert Moore and several technicians. He moved his family to Summit, New Jersey.

The assignment of the group was to seek a solid-state alternative to fragile glass vacuum tube amplifiers. Their first attempts were based on Shockley's ideas about using an external electrical field on a semiconductor to affect its conductivity. These experiments mysteriously failed every time in all sorts of configurations and materials. The group was at a standstill until Bardeen suggested a theory that invoked surface states that prevented the field from penetrating the semiconductor. The group changed its focus to study these surface states, meeting almost daily to discuss the work. The rapport of the group was excellent and ideas were freely exchanged. By the winter of 1946, they had enough results that Bardeen submitted a paper on the surface states to Physical Review. Brattain started experiments to study the surface states through observations made while shining a bright light on the semiconductor's surface. This led to several more papers (one of them co-authored with Shockley), which estimated the density of the surface states to be more than enough to account for their failed experiments. The pace of the work picked up significantly when they started to surround point contacts between the semiconductor and the conducting wires with electrolytes. Moore built a circuit that allowed them to vary the frequency of the input signal easily and suggested that they use glycol borate (gu), a viscous chemical that did not evaporate. Finally, they began to get some evidence of power amplification when Pearson, acting on a suggestion by Shockley, put a voltage on a droplet of gu placed across a p–n junction.

Invention of the transistor

On December 23, 1947, Bardeen and Brattain were working without Shockley when they succeeded in creating a point-contact transistor that achieved amplification. By the next month, Bell Labs' patent attorneys started to work on the patent applications.

Bell Labs' attorneys soon discovered that Shockley's field effect principle had been anticipated and patented in 1930 by Julius Lilienfeld, who filed his MESFET-like patent in Canada on October 22, 1925.

Shockley publicly took the lion's share of the credit for the invention of the transistor; this led to a deterioration of Bardeen's relationship with him. Bell Labs management, however, consistently presented all three inventors as a team. Shockley eventually infuriated and alienated Bardeen and Brattain, essentially blocking the two from working on the junction transistor. Bardeen began pursuing a theory for superconductivity and left Bell Labs in 1951. Brattain refused to work with Shockley further and was assigned to another group. Neither Bardeen nor Brattain had much to do with the development of the transistor beyond the first year after its invention.

The "transistor" (a portmanteau of "transconductance" and "resistor") was 1/50 the size of the vacuum tubes it replaced in televisions and radios, used far less power, was far more reliable, and it allowed electrical devices to become more compact.

University of Illinois at Urbana–Champaign

By 1951, Bardeen was looking for a new job. Fred Seitz, a friend of Bardeen, convinced the University of Illinois at Urbana–Champaign to make Bardeen an offer of $10,000 a year. Bardeen accepted the offer and left Bell Labs, joining the engineering and physics faculties at Illinois in 1951, where he was Professor of Electrical Engineering and of Physics.

At Illinois, he established two major research programs, one in the Electrical Engineering Department and one in the Physics Department. The research program in the Electrical Engineering Department dealt with both experimental and theoretical aspects of semiconductors, and the research program in the Physics Department dealt with theoretical aspects of macroscopic quantum systems, particularly superconductivity and quantum liquids.

He was an active professor at Illinois from 1951 to 1975 and then became professor emeritus. In his later life, Bardeen remained active in academic research, during which time he focused on understanding the flow of electrons in charge density waves (CDWs) through metallic linear chain compounds. His proposals that CDW electron transport is a collective quantum phenomenon (see Macroscopic quantum phenomena) were initially greeted with skepticism.  However, experiments reported in 2012 show oscillations in CDW current versus magnetic flux through tantalum trisulfide rings, similar to the behavior of superconducting quantum interference devices (see SQUID and Aharonov–Bohm effect), lending credence to the idea that collective CDW electron transport is fundamentally quantum in nature. (See quantum mechanics.) Bardeen continued his research throughout the 1980s, and published articles in Physical Review Letters and Physics Today less than a year before he died.

A collection of Bardeen's personal papers are held by the University of Illinois Archives.

Nobel Prize in Physics in 1956
In 1956, John Bardeen shared the Nobel Prize in Physics with William Shockley of Semiconductor Laboratory of Beckman Instruments and Walter Brattain of Bell Telephone Laboratories "for their researches on semiconductors and their discovery of the transistor effect".

At the Nobel Prize ceremony in Stockholm, Brattain and Shockley received their awards that night from King Gustaf VI Adolf. Bardeen brought only one of his three children to the Nobel Prize ceremony. King Gustav chided Bardeen because of this, and Bardeen assured the King that the next time he would bring all his children to the ceremony. He kept his promise.

BCS theory

In 1957, Bardeen, in collaboration with Leon Cooper and his doctoral student John Robert Schrieffer, proposed the standard theory of superconductivity known as the BCS theory (named for their initials).

Nobel Prize in Physics in 1972
In 1972, Bardeen shared the Nobel Prize in Physics with Leon N Cooper of Brown University and John Robert Schrieffer of the University of Pennsylvania "for their jointly developed theory of superconductivity, usually called the BCS-theory". This was Bardeen's second Nobel Prize in Physics. He became the first person to win two Nobel Prizes in the same field. Only four others have ever received more than one Nobel Prize.

Bardeen brought his three children to the Nobel Prize ceremony in Stockholm. Bardeen gave much of his Nobel Prize money to fund the Fritz London Memorial Lectures at Duke University.

He is the only double  laureate in physics, and one of three double laureates of the same prize; the others are Frederick Sanger who won the 1958 and 1980 Prizes in Chemistry and Karl Barry Sharpless who won the 2001 and 2022 Prizes in chemistry.

Other awards
In addition to being awarded the Nobel prize twice, Bardeen has numerous other awards including:
 1952 Franklin Institute's Stuart Ballantine Medal.
 1954 elected a member of the United States National Academy of Sciences
 1958 elected to the American Philosophical Society
 1959 elected a Fellow of the American Academy of Arts and Sciences
 1965 National Medal of Science.
 1971 IEEE Medal of Honor for "his profound contributions to the understanding of the conductivity of solids, to the invention of the transistor, and to the microscopic theory of superconductivity."
 Elected a Foreign Member of the Royal Society (ForMemRS) in 1973.
 1975 Franklin Medal.
 On January 10, 1977, John Bardeen was presented with the Presidential Medal of Freedom by President Gerald Ford. He was represented at the ceremony by his son, William Bardeen.
 Bardeen was one of 11 recipients given the Third Century Award from President George H. W. Bush in 1990 for "exceptional contributions to American society" and was granted a gold medal from the Soviet Academy of Sciences in 1988.
 1987 Golden Plate Award of the American Academy of Achievement

Xerox
Bardeen was also an important adviser to Xerox Corporation.  Though quiet by nature, he took the uncharacteristic step of urging Xerox executives to keep their California research center, Xerox PARC, afloat when the parent company was suspicious that its research center would amount to little.

Personal life
Bardeen married Jane Maxwell on July 18, 1938. While at Princeton, he met Jane during a visit to his old friends in Pittsburgh.

Bardeen was a scientist with a very unassuming personality. While he served as a professor for almost 40 years at the University of Illinois, he was best remembered by neighbors for hosting cookouts where he would prepare food for his friends, many of whom were unaware of his accomplishments at the university. He would always ask his guests if they liked the hamburger bun toasted (since he liked his that way).  He enjoyed playing golf and going on picnics with his family.  Lillian Hoddeson said that because he "differed radically from the popular stereotype of 'genius' and was uninterested in appearing other than ordinary, the public and the media often overlooked him."

When Bardeen was asked about his beliefs during a 1988 interview, he responded: "I am not a religious person, and so do not think about it very much". However, he has also said: "I feel that science cannot provide an answer to the ultimate questions about the meaning and purpose of life." Bardeen did believe in a code of moral values and behavior. John Bardeen's children were taken to church by his wife, who taught Sunday school and was a church elder. Despite this, he and his wife made it clear that they did not have faith in an afterlife and other religious ideas. He was the father of James M. Bardeen.

Death
Bardeen died of heart disease at age 82 at Brigham and Women's Hospital in Boston, Massachusetts, on January 30, 1991. Although he lived in Champaign-Urbana, he had come to Boston for medical consultation. Bardeen and his wife Jane (1907–1997) are buried in Forest Hill Cemetery, Madison, Wisconsin. They were survived by three children, James, William and Elizabeth Bardeen Greytak, and six grandchildren.

Legacy

In honor of Bardeen, the engineering quadrangle at the University of Illinois at Urbana-Champaign is named the Bardeen Quad.

Also in honor of Bardeen, Sony Corporation endowed a $3 million John Bardeen professorial chair at the University of Illinois at Urbana-Champaign, beginning in 1990. Sony Corporation owed much of its success to commercializing Bardeen's transistors in portable TVs and radios, and had worked with Illinois researchers. , the John Bardeen Professor is Yurii Vlasov.

At the time of Bardeen's death, then-University of Illinois chancellor Morton Weir said, "It is a rare person whose work changes the life of every American; John's did."

Bardeen was honored on a March 6, 2008, United States postage stamp as part of the "American Scientists" series designed by artist Victor Stabin. The $0.41 stamp was unveiled in a ceremony at the University of Illinois.  His citation reads: "Theoretical physicist John Bardeen (1908–1991) shared the Nobel Prize in Physics twice—in 1956, as co-inventor of the transistor and in 1972, for the explanation of superconductivity.  The transistor paved the way for all modern electronics, from computers to microchips.  Diverse applications of superconductivity include infrared sensors and medical imaging systems."  The other scientists on the "American Scientists" sheet include biochemist Gerty Cori, chemist Linus Pauling and astronomer Edwin Hubble.

References

External links
 
 
 The Bardeen Archives at the University of Illinois at Urbana-Champaign
  including his 2 Nobel lectures 
 December 11, 1956 Semiconductor Research Leading to the Point Contact Transistor 
 December 11, 1972 Electron-Phonon Interactions and Superconductivity
 Associated Press Obituary of John Bardeen as printed in The Boston Globe
 Oral History interview transcript with John Bardeen on 12 May 1977, American Institute of Physics, Niels Bohr Library and Archives - Session I, interviewed by Lillian Hoddeson
 Oral History interview transcript with John Bardeen on 16 May 1977, American Institute of Physics, Niels Bohr Library and Archives – Session II, interviewed by Lillian Hoddeson
 Oral History interview transcript with John Bardeen on 1 December 1977, American Institute of Physics, Niels Bohr Library and Archives – Session III, interviewed by Lillian Hoddeson
 Oral History interview transcript with John Bardeen on 22 December 1977, American Institute of Physics, Niels Bohr Library and Archives - Session IV, interviewed by Lillian Hoddeson
 Oral History interview transcript with John Bardeen on 4 April 1978, American Institute of Physics, Niels Bohr Library and Archives – Session V, interviewed by Lillian Hoddeson and Gordon Baym
 Oral History interview transcript with John Bardeen on 13 February 1980, American Institute of Physics, Niels Bohr Library and Archives, interviewed by Lillian Hoddeson
 Interview with Bardeen about his experience at Princeton
The American Presidency Project
 IEEE History Center biography
 IEEE second Int. Conference on Computers, Communications and Control (ICCCC 2008), an event dedicated to the Centenary of John Bardeen (1908–1991)
  – "Three-Electrode Circuit Element Utilizing Semiconductive Materials"

1908 births
1991 deaths
People from Summit, New Jersey
Princeton University alumni
20th-century American inventors
20th-century American physicists
American agnostics
American electrical engineers
American Nobel laureates
Members of the United States National Academy of Sciences
Foreign Members of the Royal Society
Fellows of the American Physical Society
Nobel laureates in Physics
Nobel laureates with multiple Nobel awards
Oliver E. Buckley Condensed Matter Prize winners
Scientists from Madison, Wisconsin
Quantum physicists
University of Wisconsin–Madison College of Engineering alumni
Presidential Medal of Freedom recipients
IEEE Medal of Honor recipients
Presidents of the American Physical Society
Engineers from Wisconsin
Inventors from Wisconsin
Members of the American Philosophical Society